The 1961–62 season saw AC Milan compete in Serie A, the Coppa Italia and the Fairs Cup. The club went on to win the Serie A. In the Coppa Italia they were knocked out by Mondena who played in Serie B.

Summary 
The 1961–62 season gave way to Nereo Rocco as newly appointed manager  and Dino Sani's arrival (replacing Jimmy Greaves in November)  that provided President Andrea Rizzoli with the right amount of talent to aim for a championship win.

Young star Gianni Rivera initially struggled to gain playing time under new manager Nereo Rocco during the 1961–62 season, his second at the club, also being linked with loans to Vicenza and Juventus, but won his way back into the starting line-up and played a decisive role, scoring 10 goals in the league. Throughout the season, Rivera formed an important relationship with the legendary manager and catenaccio mastermind; he played a key role in the club's successes under Rocco, who subsequently built a hard-working, winning team around Rivera that complemented the midfielder's creative playing style.

The season started with success at home against Juventus (5-1), and then created an unstoppable winning streak for Milan, that would see them only lose once in twenty-one matches. It would also be a defeat for Juventus back in their own home town that year, as Milan delivered a 4–2 win.

It would seem Rocco's only regret of the 1961–62 season would be in the Milano Derby as Inter won with the result 2–0.  In spite of those who accused the father and pioneer of the real catenaccio, Milan gave way to dominate the field with eighty-three goals scored in thirty-four games (an average of 2.4 goals per match) and with thirty-four goals conceded. While Juventus was nowhere near the top contention that year, Inter, Fiorentina, and Bologna were the only true runner-ups for the scudetto race.

That same year, Milan played in the Fourth Inter-Cities Fairs Cup (this was the predecessor of the UEFA Europa League Cup), however, Milan did not go far and lost in the first round against the Yugoslavian team Novi Sad.

Season squad 

 (Captain)

Transfers

In

Out

Loans

Competitions

Serie A

League table

Matches

Coppa Italia

Second round

Friendship Cup

Eightfinals

Quarterfinals

Semifinals

Fairs Cup

Round of 32

Statistics

Squad statistics

Players statistics 
36.Cesare Maldini 
35.José Altafini
34.Giovanni Trapattoni 
33.Sandro Salvadore
32.Mario David
31.Giorgio Ghezzi
30.Gianni Rivera 
29.Paolo Barison 
29.Luigi Radice 
24.Gino Pivatelli 
23.Ambrogio Pelagalli 
22.Dino Sani 
20.Giancarlo Danova
17.Oliviero Conti
16.Francesco Zagatti 
13.Jimmy Greaves
12.Mario Liberalato
12.Mario Trebbi 
7.Giovanni Lodetti
6.Luciano Alfieri 
6.Antonio Pasinato
5.Alcides Ghiggia
4.Orlando Rozzoni 
4.Sergio Tenente 
2.Emanuele Del Vecchio 
1.Bruno Beretti 
1.Paolo Ferrario

Goal scorers
22.José Altafini 
9.Paolo Barison 
6.Oliviero Conti 
8.Giancarlo Danova 
3.Mario David 
2.Emanuele Del Vecchio 
8.Jimmy Greaves 
3.Giovanni Lodetti 
1.Cesare Maldini 
1.Ambrogio Pelagalli
9.Gino Pivatelli 
1.Luigi Radice 
10.Gianni Rivera 
4.Orlando Rozzoni 
8.Dino Sani 
1.Francesco Zagatti

References

External links 
 
 

A.C. Milan seasons
Milan
Italian football championship-winning seasons